Thomas or Tom Ford may refer to:

 Thomas Ford (martyr) (died 1582), English martyr
 Thomas Ford (composer) (c. 1580–1648), English composer, lutenist, and viol player
 Thomas Ford (minister) (1598–1674), English nonconformist minister
 Thomas Ford (politician) (1800–1850), governor of Illinois
 Thomas Ford (rower), British rower
 Thomas H. Ford (1814–1868), American politician in Ohio
 Tom Ford (baseball) (1866–1917), baseball pitcher
 Thomas F. Ford (1873–1958), California politician
 Thomas Ford (architect) (1891–1971), British architect
 Thomas Gardner Ford (1918–1995), Member of the Michigan House of Representatives
 Tom Ford (born 1961), American designer
 Thomas Mikal Ford (1964–2016), American actor
 Tom Ford (presenter) (born 1977), British television presenter
 Tom Ford (snooker player) (born 1983), English snooker player
 Tom Ford (squash player) (born 1993), British squash player
 "Tom Ford" (song), a 2013 song by Jay-Z

See also
 Tommy Ford (disambiguation)